Al-Rayaam (also transliterated as Al-Rae Al-Aam, Al-Rai Al-Aam, and Al-Ra'y al-Amm) ( meaning Public Opinion) is the oldest newspaper in Sudan. It was founded on March 15, 1945, by Ismail Al Atabani. As of 2011, it had a daily circulation of about 18,000. 

It is an Islamist paper and had strong links to the government of Omar al-Bashir, but also employed columnists who were anti-government.

References

Newspapers published in Sudan
Arabic newspapers
Newspapers established in 1945
1945 establishments in Sudan